Shanty town or Shantytown may refer to:

Geography

New Zealand
 Shantytown Heritage Park

United States
 Shanty Town, Minnesota
 Shantytown, Nevada
 Shantytown, Wisconsin

Media
 "Shantytown", 1943 film
 "Shanty Town", 2023 TV series
 "007 (Shanty Town)", 1967 song